Marja-Liisa Olthuis (née Mujo; born August 9, 1967 in Partakko, Inari, Finland) is an Inari Sámi linguist, academic, translator, and writer, who currently lives in the Netherlands with her Dutch husband and children. She received the Israel Ruong Scholarship from the Sámi Institute in 1999. On April 14, 2007, she became the first Inari Sámi to successfully defend a doctoral thesis about the Inari Sámi language in Inari Sámi.  On 21 February 2020 she was awarded the Linguapax Prize.

References

Bibliography
 Olthuis, Marja-Liisa. Evangelium Matteus mield (1995)
 Olthuis, Marja-Liisa. Kielâoppâ (2000)
 Olthuis, Marja-Liisa. Kaksitavuiset pohjoissaamen -mi- ja inarinsaamen -mi/-me -nomiinit ja niiden alkuperä (2001)
 Olthuis, Marja-Liisa. Sämikielâ sänikirje suomâ-säämi (2005)
 Olthuis, Marja-Liisa. Sämikielâ sänikirje säämi-suoma ja suomâ-säämi (2005)
 Olthuis, Marja-Liisa. Inarinsaamen lajinnimet lintujen ja sienten kansannimitysten historiaa ja oppitekoisten uudisnimien muodostuksen metodiikkaa (2007)

External links
 Marja-Liisa Olthuis
 Doctoral thesis to be defended in Inari Sámi
 Marja-Liisa Olthuis és la guanyadora del Premi Internacional Linguapax 2020

1967 births
Living people
Inari Sámi people
Finnish Sámi people
Sámi women academics
Linguists from Finland
Linguists of Sámi
People from Inari, Finland
Finnish expatriates in the Netherlands